"Up All Night" is a song by the American musician Beck. It is the third single (fourth worldwide) from his thirteenth studio album Colors.

Background and release
Before its official release, the song was included in the soundtrack for the video game FIFA 17 in September 2016 and was also used in a commercial for the smartwatch company Fossil.

"Up All Night" was released to triple-A radio September 18, 2017 in the United States as the third single from the album Colors.
It was then sent to alternative radio September 19, 2017.

Live performances
Beck performed the song on Later... with Jools Holland and The Ellen DeGeneres Show in October 2017, and on The Tonight Show Starring Jimmy Fallon December 6, 2017.

Music video
The music video, directed and produced by the Catalan production company CANADA, was released on September 6, 2017. It stars French actress Solene Rigot and Pedro Attemborough. It depicts Attemborough falling unconscious during a wild and raucous party while Rigot, adorned in knight's armor and brandishing a shield made from a street sign, rushes through the apartment complex to rescue him. It was nominated for best music video at the 2018 Grammy Awards.

Track listing
Digital download
"Up All Night" (Oliver Remix) – 4:26

Chart performance
"Up All Night" peaked at number one on the Billboard Alternative Songs airplay chart. This marks Beck's third number-one single and his first since "E-Pro" in 2005. He is one of six acts to accomplish three chart toppers on the Alternative chart in three different decades.

Charts

Weekly charts

Year-end charts

References

2017 songs
Beck songs
Songs written by Greg Kurstin
Songs written by Beck